Ozyptila nigristerna is a crab spider species found in Italy.

References

External links 

nigristerna
Spiders of Europe
Spiders described in 1922